Pristimantis acuminatus is a species of frog in the family Strabomantidae. It is found in the Amazon rainforest of Ecuador, northern Peru, and adjacent Colombia and Brazil. It is a lowland Amazonian rainforest species that also occurs on the lower reaches of the Andes. It may also occur in cultivated areas. This widespread species is not considered threatened.

References

acuminatus
Amphibians of Brazil
Amphibians of Colombia
Amphibians of Ecuador
Amphibians of Peru
Amphibians described in 1935
Taxonomy articles created by Polbot
Taxa named by Benjamin Shreve